Hyderomastgroningem is the fifth studio album by Japanese band Ruins, released in 1995 through Tzadik Records. Rolling Stone ranked the album 49th on their list of the 50 greatest progressive rock albums of all time.

Track listing
All tracks written by Tatsuya Yoshida.

Personnel
Tatsuya Yoshida – drums, percussion, vocals
Ryuichi Masuda – bass guitar, vocals

References 

Ruins (Japanese band) albums
Tzadik Records albums
1995 albums